Daniel "Dan" Ravicher serves as executive director of the Public Patent Foundation (PUBPAT). In 1997 he graduated magna cum laude with University Honors from the University of South Florida with a B.S.C.E., and earned a J.D. in 2000 from the University of Virginia School of Law where he was a Franklin O’Blechman Scholar, a Mortimer Caplin Public Service Award recipient, and an Editor of the Virginia Journal of Law and Technology.

See also
 Software patents and free software - on which he performed a noteworthy study

References

External links
 LWN Interview: Dan Ravicher on derived works
 Daniel Ravicher's Cardozo Law School Profile page

American patent attorneys
GNU people
Year of birth missing (living people)
Living people